The Main road 13 is a north–south direction Secondary class main road in the Kisalföld, that connects the border of Slovakia to the Main road 81.

The road, as well as all other main roads in Hungary, is managed and maintained by Magyar Közút, state owned company.

See also

 Roads in Hungary

Sources

External links

 Hungarian Public Road Non-Profit Ltd. (Magyar Közút Nonprofit Zrt.)
 National Infrastructure Developer Ltd.

Main roads in Hungary
Komárom-Esztergom County